Nina Elizabeth Agzarian (born 18 December 1984), known professionally by her stage name Nina Las Vegas, is an Australian radio host, DJ and music producer. From 2009 to 2014 she was the host of House Party on national radio station Triple J. She released compilation albums, House Party Volume 1 (3 August 2012) and House Party Volume 2 (2 August 2013), which appeared on the ARIA Charts. In 2015 she started her own music recording label "NLV Records". Las Vegas is also signed to the label.

Biography

1984-2006: Early life
Nina Elizabeth Agzarian was born on 18 December 1984 in Wagga Wagga, the second daughter to an Armenian-Egyptian father, Michael (Graphic Designer and Advertiser of Advision (Surry Hills, Australia)) and Australian mother, Janine née Bishop (a teacher at St Joseph's Primary School). She attended South Wagga Public School.  At eighteen, she moved to Sydney to commence university, where she started working in radio production. In 2004 she began an internship at national youth radio broadcaster, Triple J, where she adopted the stage name of Nina Las Vegas.

2007-2015: Heaps Decent & House Party
In 2007 Agzarian, Andrew Levins (a Sydney DJ) and Diplo (an American DJ, music producer, and songwriter) established Heaps Decent as a non-profit organisation which supports emerging underprivileged and indigenous musicians. Heaps Decent offers ongoing music programs at schools, juvenile justice centres and youth drop-in centres in New South Wales.

From 2009 to 2014 Agzarian was the host of House Party on Triple J. On 3 August 2012 Triple J released a double album, House Party Volume 1, where she mixed the tracks for various artists. The album peaked at number 2 on the ARIA Compilation Albums chart.

On 2 August 2013 Triple J issued a follow-up compilation album, House Party Volume 2, again with Agzarian mixing for various artists, which was also certified Gold. Both compilation albums made the ARIA top 25 dance albums of the year for the respective year of their release.

During this time she curated and toured with acts such as Flume, Beni, What So Not, Flight Facilities, Wave Racer, Indian Summer and Tyler Touché across the country as part of the Triple J House Party and 'NLV Presents' National Tours. She performed at Stereosonic and Splendour in the Grass in 2014, which attracted some criticism as she was a DJ and not a musician. She selected the soundtrack for the Sydney New Year's Eve fireworks to bring in 2015.

2014-present: Solo releases
In 2014 Agzarian released her first official single "Don't Send", with Melbourne producer Swick on American DJ and music producer, Skrillex's online label, Nest HQ.

In 2015 Agzarian announced her tour of the United States including performances at South by Southwest and the Winter Music Conference. As of February 2015 Agzarian produces and presents Mix Up Exclusives on Triple J, on Saturdays from 9 to 10 p.m. Agazarian has since resigned from Triple J to pursue her record label 'NLV Records' and solo career.

She released "Impossible" on 10 April 2020.

Discography

Compilation albums

Extended plays

Singles

Awards and nominations

AIR Awards
The Australian Independent Record Awards (commonly known informally as AIR Awards) is an annual awards night to recognise, promote and celebrate the success of Australia's Independent Music sector.

|-
| AIR Awards of 2019
|Lucky Girl
| Best Independent Dance/Electronic Album
| 
|-

References

External links
Profile at triple j

Living people
1984 births
Australian DJs
Australian women musicians
Australian women radio presenters
Women DJs
Triple J announcers
People from Wagga Wagga
21st-century women musicians